Canadian Navy Reserve may refer to:

 Royal Naval Canadian Volunteer Reserve (RNCVR; 1914-1923)
 Royal Canadian Naval Volunteer Reserve (RCNVR; 1923-1945)
 Canadian Naval Reserve (1945-1968), see Canadian Forces Naval Reserve
 Canadian Forces Naval Reserve (1968-2012)
 Royal Canadian Navy Primary Reserve (2012-onwards), see Canadian Forces Naval Reserve

Royal Canadian Navy
Naval history of Canada